Geropogon is a genus of flowering plants in the family Asteraceae.

Species
Several species names have been published in the genus, but only one is recognized. Geropogon hybridus, the pasture goatsbeard or slender salsify, is native to the Mediterranean and adjacent areas, from the Canary Islands to Iran.

References

Cichorieae
Monotypic Asteraceae genera